The 2003 Sydney to Hobart Yacht Race, sponsored by Rolex, was the 59th annual running of the "blue water classic" Sydney to Hobart Yacht Race. As in past editions of the race, it was hosted by the Cruising Yacht Club of Australia based in Sydney, New South Wales.It began at Sydney Harbour, at 1pm on Boxing Day (26 December 2003), before heading south for 630 nautical miles (1,170 km) through the Tasman Sea, past Bass Strait, into Storm Bay and up the River Derwent, to cross the finish line in Hobart, Tasmania.

The 2003 fleet comprised 56 starters of which 52 completed the race and 4 yachts retired.

Results

Line Honours results (top 10)

Handicap results (top 10)

References

Sydney to Hobart Yacht Race
S
2003 in Australian sport
December 2003 sports events in Australia
January 2004 sports events in Australia